Ingelbrecht Knudssøn (14 December 1776 – 21 March 1826) was a Norwegian civil servant and politician.

Knudssøn was born at Byneset in Sør-Trøndelag. He received his law certification from the University of Copenhagen in 1804. He was a judge in Finnmark   1810–1815, magistrate in Romsdal and bailiff in Molde 1816-1821 and from 1821 he was the judge in Strinda and Selbu. Knudssøn was elected in the Norwegian Parliament in 1818 and 1821 as a representative from Kristiansund and Molde; in 1824 he represented Trondheim.

References

1776 births
1826 deaths
Presidents of the Storting
Members of the Storting
University of Copenhagen alumni
People from Sør-Trøndelag
Royal Norwegian Society of Sciences and Letters